Crystal-Donna Roberts (born 13 October 1984) is a South African actress and presenter. She is best known for her roles in the films The Endless River (2015) and Krotoa (2017).

Early life
Roberts spent her early childhood in Cape Town, living in Bonteheuwel, Kensington, and Factreton. She completed her secondary education in Bloemfontein. She went on to graduate with a Bachelor of Arts in Drama and Theatre from the University of the Free State in 2005. A year later, she moved back to Cape Town where she briefly worked as a high school drama teacher before pursuing acting as a career.

Filmography

Film

Television

Stage

Awards and nominations

References

External links
 
 Crystal-Donna Roberts at TVSA

Living people
1984 births
Actresses from Cape Town
Coloured South African people
People from Bloemfontein
South African film actresses
University of the Free State alumni